Kianuko Provincial Park is a provincial park in British Columbia, Canada.

History
The park was established July 12, 1995. This is an area of Ktunaxa-kinbasket First Nation traditional use and has high spiritual values.

Conservation
The park aims to protect important habitat for caribou, moose and grizzly bear, and fish.

Recreation
The following recreational activities are available: backcountry camping and hiking, fishing, and hunting.

Location
Located 40 kilometres north of Creston, British Columbia. Access to the park is usually done by hiking from Lockhart Creek Provincial Park, but vehicle access to the park boundary is possible via old unmaintained forestry roads.

Size
11,638 hectares in size.
On Vehicle to Park Gate from Highway # 3 in Kitchener, via Goat River Rd and Skelly Creek Road. Only hiking or on Horseback into the Park is accepted.

External links
Kianuko Provincial Park

Provincial parks of British Columbia
Regional District of Central Kootenay
1995 establishments in British Columbia
Protected areas established in 1995